Berger v. United States, 255 U.S. 22 (1921), is a United States Supreme Court decision overruling a trial court decision by U.S. District Court Judge Kenesaw Mountain Landis against Rep. Victor L. Berger, a Congressman for Wisconsin's 5th district and the founder of the Social Democratic Party of America, and several other German-American defendants who were convicted of violating the Espionage Act by publicizing anti-interventionist views during World War I.

Opinion 
The case was argued on December 9, 1920, and decided on January 31, 1921, with an opinion by Justice Joseph McKenna and dissents by Justices William R. Day, James Clark McReynolds, and Mahlon Pitney. The Supreme Court held that Judge Landis was properly disqualified as trial judge based on an affidavit filed by the German defendants asserting that Judge Landis' public anti-German statements should disqualify him from presiding over the trial of the defendants. The Berger test states that to disqualify a judge;1) a party files an affidavit claiming personal bias or prejudice demonstrating an "objectionable inclination or disposition of the judge" and 2) claim of bias is based on facts antedating the trial.

Subsequent developments 
The House of Representatives twice denied Berger his seat in the House due to his original conviction for espionage using Section 3 of the Fourteenth Amendment to the United States Constitution regarding denying office to those who supported "insurrection or rebellion." The Supreme Court overturned the verdict in 1921 in Berger v. U.S., and Berger won three successive terms in the House in the 1920s.

References

United States Supreme Court cases
Legal history of Wisconsin
1921 in United States case law
1921 in Wisconsin
United States Supreme Court cases of the White Court